Akelo's Village is a settlement in Kenya's Homa Bay County.

Languages 
The predominant language in Nyanza is Dholuo, a Nilotic language whose origins are from Southern Sudan, spoken by the Luo.

Other languages include Gusii, Luhya, Kuria, Suba and the national languages English and Swahili. Other languages from the many Kenyan communities are also spoken in small pockets by migrants from these communities.

History 
Before the Kenyan general election in 2013, Akelo's Village voted as part of the Nyanza Province.

References 

Populated places in Nyanza Province
Homa Bay County